Guraleus incrusta is a species of sea snail, a marine gastropod mollusk in the family Mangeliidae.

Description
The length of the shell attains 7 mm. It is a smaller shell than Guraleus lallemantianus (Crosse & Fischer, 1865), with two of the revolving striae more prominent (on the body whorl 8–9), slightly keel-like.

Distribution
This marine species is endemic to Australia and can be found off Western Australia, South Australia, Tasmania and Victoria.

References

 Tenison-Woods, J.E. 1877. On some new Tasmanian marine shells. Papers and Proceedings of the Royal Society of Tasmania 1876: 131–159 
 Verco, J.C. 1909. Notes on South Australian marine Mollusca with descriptions of new species. Part XII. Transactions of the Royal Society of South Australia 33: 293–342
 May, W.L. 1923. An Illustrated Index of Tasmanian Shells: with 47 plates and 1052 species. Hobart : Government Printer 100 pp.

External links
 Tenison-Woods, J.E. 1877. On some new Tasmanian marine shells; Papers and proceedings of the Royal Society of Tasmania, 1877 
  Tucker, J.K. 2004 Catalog of recent and fossil turrids (Mollusca: Gastropoda). Zootaxa 682:1–1295.
 
  Hedley, C. 1922. A revision of the Australian Turridae. Records of the Australian Museum 13(6): 213–359, pls 42–56 

incrusta
Gastropods described in 1877
Gastropods of Australia